The 1963–64 Ice hockey Bundesliga season was the sixth season of the Ice hockey Bundesliga, the top level of ice hockey in Germany. Eight teams participated in the league, and EV Fussen won the championship.

First round

Final round

Qualification round

References

Eishockey-Bundesliga seasons
Bund
Ger